Four for Venice is a 1998 comedy film directed by Vivian Naefe.

Plot
The film involves two married couples: Nick and Charlotte and Luis and Eva.

Nick and Charlotte are more than busy earning money, there is no time for love or sex - only Tuesdays. Soon, Charlotte finds a lover, Luis, an unsuccessful artist. Luis and Eva also have no time for sex: he must find his inspiration for art and Eva has agreed to give up her own occupation as an artist to support themselves and their 3 and 6 year old kids by working in a restaurant.

The secret affair between Luis and Charlotte lasts quite a while, they decide to spend a romantic week in Venice, Italy, but accidentally Eva finds out about the affair and their destination.

Eva kidnaps Nick on her trip to Venice in order to restore her marriage as well as his. During their stay in Venice, Luis becomes ill and spends the entire week in the bathroom. On their way from Munich, Germany (where the first half of the story takes place) to Venice, Eva's car breaks down somewhere in the Alps, so she, Nick, and her two children are forced to walk and hitchhike the rest of the way.

Nick is allergic to children and continually sneezes but the children grow warm on him, since Eva's no-nonsense attitude forces him to spend a lot of time with them. They arrive in Venice without money, passports, credit cards, their clothes torn and burnt, on a Friday evening, which means that they have to spend the weekend without any support from the German consulate. When they finally meet their respective spouses, things are not quite the same for neither of them.

Main cast
Aglaia Szyszkowitz – Eva
Heino Ferch – Nick
Gedeon Burkhard – Luis
Hilde Van Mieghem – Charlotte

See also
List of German language films

External links

1998 films
1990s German-language films
1998 comedy films
German comedy films
1990s German films